The 1956 French Grand Prix was a Formula One motor race held on 1 July 1956 at Reims. It was race 5 of 8 in the 1956 World Championship of Drivers.

Bugatti made a one-off appearance in this race with their Type 251 driven by Maurice Trintignant. The car proved to be uncompetitive and he retired after 18 laps.

Classification

Qualifying

Race

Notes
 – Includes 1 point for fastest lap

Shared drives
 Car #6: Cesare Perdisa (20 laps) and Stirling Moss (39 laps). They shared the 2 points for fifth place.
 Car #24: Mike Hawthorn (10 laps) and Harry Schell (46 laps).

Championship standings after the race 
Drivers' Championship standings

Note: Only the top five positions are included.

References

French Grand Prix
French Grand Prix
1956 in French motorsport